Gouvelândia is a municipality in south Goiás state, Brazil.  Gouvelândia is a large producer of sesame and peanuts.

Location
Gouvelândia is located in the Quirinópolis Microregion, 35 kilometers west of the most important city, Quirinópolis.  The Rio dos Bois, a tributary of the Paranaíba crosses the region.  The southern boundary is with the São Simão artificial lake and the border with the state of Minas Gerais.

The distance to state capital, Goiânia, is 299 km.  Highway connections from Goiânia are by GO-040 / Aragoiânia / Cromínia / GO-215 / Pontalina / GO-040 / Aloândia / Bom Jesus de Goiás / BR-452 / Itumbiara / GO-206 / BR-483 / Cachoeira Dourada / Inaciolândia. See Sepin for all the distances.

Neighboring municipalities are:
north:  Castelândia
south:  Santa Vitória, Minas Gerais
east: Inaciolândia
west:  Quirinópolis

Demographics
Population density in 2007: 5.43 inhabitants/km2
Population growth rate 1996/2007: 0.98.%
Total population in 2007: 4,507
Total population in 1980: 4,136
Urban population in 2007: 3,466
Rural population in 2007: 1,041
Population change: the population has increased about 350 inhabitants since 1980.

The economy
The main economic activities were cattle raising and agriculture.  Agricultural production was based on cattle raising (73,000 in 2006), cotton, peanuts, sesame seeds, corn, and soybeans.

Economic Data (2007)
Industrial establishments: 5
Financial Institutions in 2007: Banco do Brasil S.A.
Retail establishments in 2007: 1,282
Automobiles: 258 (2007)

Main agricultural products in ha.(2006)
cotton:      146
sugarcane:  5,000
corn:      2,500
sesame: 1,500 (largest producer in the state)
soybeans: 4,000

Farm Data (2006)in ha.
Number of farms:                115
Total area:                  885,613
Area of permanent crops:        not available
Area of perennial crops:     129,010
Area of natural pasture:     657,315
Persons dependent on farming: 310
Farms with tractors:            44
Number of tractors:             84 IBGE

Health and education
There were 04 schools with 1,640 students (2006).  There were no hospitals. 
Literacy rate: 84.0%
Infant mortality rate: 24.07 in 1,000 live births
Ranking on the Municipal Human Development Index:  0.754
State ranking:  114 (out of 242 municipalities in 2000)
National ranking:  2,228 (out of 5,507 municipalities in 2000)  For the complete list see Frigoletto

Gouvelândia first became a district of Quirinópolis in 1963, gaining municipal status in 1983.

See also
 List of municipalities in Goiás

References

Frigoletto

Municipalities in Goiás